Aigner-Schanze, officially called Energie AG-Skisprung Arena for sponsorship reasons, is a ski jumping venue located in Hinzenbach, Austria. It hosts the FIS Women's Ski Jumping World Cup and the Summer Grand Prix. Markus Eggenhofer holds the hill record.

The first hill was completed in the 1930s and was owned by Union Volksbank Hinzenbach. In 2006, the construction of the normal hill began, which was opened on 9 October 2010.

Ski jumping venues in Austria
Sports venues in Upper Austria
2010 establishments in Austria
Sports venues completed in 2010
Eferding District